Berean Christian School is a private, Christian co-educational school in Knoxville, Tennessee, serving Kindergarten through the 12th grade. Their name comes from the Berean people from the biblical book of Acts.

History 
Berean Christian School was founded in 1980 as a ministry outreach of Berean Bible Church in Knoxville, Tennessee, initially just using the church's main building as the campus. Eventually, the school grew to the point where an upper campus was built on the hill behind the church, which now serves as classroom space for the middle school and high school. Today, Berean is known for having an exceptional Fine Arts program and is part of the TSSAA Division 1. In 2017, the girls' volleyball team became the first in the school's history to make it to the Class A State Girls' Volleyball Tournament Bracket, going undefeated for all four games to win their first title as well.

Accreditation 
Berean Christian School is accredited by the Association of Christian Schools International (ACSI) and the Southern Association of Colleges and Schools (SACS).

References

Christian schools in Tennessee
Private K-12 schools in Tennessee
Schools in Knoxville, Tennessee